The American West Hockey League (AWHL) was an American Tier III Junior ice hockey league based in Montana and Wyoming.  The league was a member of USA Hockey and was founded in 2011. The AWHL merged into the NA3HL in March 2014.

History
The AWHL was formed in the summer of 2011 by teams breaking away from the Northern Pacific Hockey League (NorPac).  The league shares a similar area as the former America West Hockey League that merged into the North American Hockey League in 2003.  Bozeman, Billings, Great Falls, and Helena all had teams in the old AWHL.

In 2012, the AWHL welcomed the Yellowstone Quake from Cody, Wyoming, to the league. The Quake was previously a member of the NorPac and began play in the AWHL for the 2012–13 season. In February 2013 it was announced the Glacier Nationals from Whitefish, Montana were accepted in the AWHL for the 2013-2014 season. The Nationals, another former member of the NorPac, had played a split schedule with the NorPac and the AWHL for the 2012–13 season. The Nationals would join the AWHL as a full-time member in 2013–14.

In April 2013 the Missoula Maulers announced that they will be leaving the AWHL and joining the Western States Hockey League for the 2013–14 hockey season.

In March 2014, the North American 3 Hockey League (NA3HL) announced that the AWHL would merge into the league as the new Frontier Division.

2013-14 teams

Former teams

Past champions
2011-12 Helena Bighorns
2012-13 Helena Bighorns

References

External links
Official website

 
Junior ice hockey leagues in the United States
Ice hockey in Wyoming
Ice hockey in Montana